Langstrom or Långström is a surname. Notable people with the surname include:

People
Toivo Hjalmar Långström (1889–1983), Finnish politician

Fictional characters
Francine Langstrom, DC Comics 
Kirk Langstrom, DC Comics supervillain